Swan Island is a private mooring island in the Thames at Twickenham, in the London Borough of Richmond upon Thames, London, England.

The island has a commercial boatyard in addition to residential mooring for boats. It is connected to the Twickenham bank by a small bridge, which is suitable for vehicles as well as foot traffic.

A larger island stood north-west which has become the playground, bowling green, café and park Radnor Gardens, Strawberry Hill/Vale.

Citations and footnotes

See also
Islands in the River Thames

Areas of London
Islands of the River Thames
Geography of the London Borough of Richmond upon Thames
Islands of London
Twickenham
Private islands of the United Kingdom